Erbessa cingulina is a moth of the family Notodontidae first described by Herbert Druce in 1885.

Description
The species has a high wing-pattern variability. Usually forewings are deep black, with all the nerves ochraceous brown and an oval spot at the end of the cell. Hindwings are creamy white with the margins broadly banded with black. The abdomen with a central streak and one on each side bright yellow.

Distribution
This species can be found from northern Bolivia north to central Peru, along the eastern slope of the Andes.

References

 Discover Life

Moths described in 1885
Notodontidae of South America